Sebadani Dam  is a dam in the Nagano Prefecture, Japan, completed in 1928.

References 

Dams in Nagano Prefecture
Dams completed in 1928
1928 establishments in Japan